The Midvale Ridge is a natural region in South Central England formed by a band of low-lying limestone hills that run from southeast to northwest from the Vale of Aylesbury to Swindon. It has been designated as National Character Area 109 by Natural England, the UK Government's advisors on the natural environment.

The Midvale Ridge crosses the counties of Wiltshire, Oxfordshire and Buckinghamshire. It is surrounded by the lowlands of the Oxfordshire clay vales and offers good views over the local countryside. The area is dominated by agriculture with a mixed arable/ pastoral farming landscape. Cereals are the most important arable crop.

The main settlements are the town of Swindon in the west, and the city of Oxford, in the centre. Otherwise the area is relatively sparsely populated with small nucleated villages along the crest of the ridge and along the springline. Soils comprise a mix of heavy rendzinas, stagnogleys and lighter sandy brown earths with small patches of sandy soils.

The area has a number of important geological sites and has yielded fossils of international importance, including the holotypes for several ammonite species and several species of prehistoric sponges known only from the Faringdon area.

References 

Natural regions of England
Geography of Buckinghamshire
Geography of Oxfordshire
Geography of Wiltshire